The 2018 Lisboa Belém Open was a professional tennis tournament played on clay courts. It was the second edition of the tournament which was part of the 2018 ATP Challenger Tour. It took place in Lisbon, Portugal between 14 and 20 May 2018.

Singles main-draw entrants

Seeds

 1 Rankings are as of 7 May 2018.

Other entrants
The following players received wildcards into the singles main draw:
  Tiago Cação
  Taro Daniel
  Fred Gil
  João Monteiro

The following players received entry from the qualifying draw:
  Alejandro Davidovich Fokina
  Joris De Loore
  Edoardo Eremin
  Juan Pablo Ficovich

The following player received entry as a lucky loser:
  Federico Gaio

Champions

Singles

 Tommy Robredo def.  Christian Garín 3–6, 6–3, 6–2.

Doubles

 Marcelo Arévalo /  Miguel Ángel Reyes-Varela def.  Tomasz Bednarek /  Hunter Reese 6–3, 3–6, [10–1].

References

Lisboa Belém Open
2018
2010s in Lisbon
2018 Lisboa Belém Open